Eriocapitella hupehensis, a species of flowering plant in the buttercup family Ranunculaceae, is native to Asia. The specific epithet hupehensis, which means "from Hupeh (Hupei, Hubei) province, China", refers to a region where the species is known to occur. In Chinese, it is called dǎ pò wǎn huā huā (打破碗花花), which means "broken bowl flower".

Description 

Eriocapitella hupehensis is a perennial herbaceous plant with a rhizome-like root structure. The lateral leaflets are similar to but smaller than the central leaflet. A whorl of 3 leaves (technically bracts) wraps around the stem. The stem leaves are similar in appearance to the basal leaves but somewhat smaller. In its native habitat, the flower usually has 5 sepals (no petals) but cultivated plants have double flowers with around 20 sepals. The sepals may be purple, purple-red, pink or white. The fruits are small ovoid achenes with straight styles.

Taxonomy 
Eriocapitella hupehensis was described by Maarten J. M. Christenhusz and James W. Byng in 2018. Like other members of genus Eriocapitella, E. hupehensis was formerly a member of genus Anemone. The basionym Anemone japonica var. hupehensis Lemoine was described in 1908.

Distribution 

Eriocapitella hupehensis is native to Asia, in the Eastern Himalaya region, East Asia, and Southeast Asia.

 Eastern Himalaya: Nepal, Assam (northeast India), Tibet
 East and Southeast Asia: China, Taiwan, Myanmar
 Northwest China: Shaanxi
 Central China: Hubei
 East China: Jiangxi, Zhejiang
 South China: Guangdong, Guangxi
 Southwest China: Guizhou, Sichuan, Yunnan

The species was introduced into Czechoslovakia, Ecuador, and Germany.

Ecology

Eriocapitella hupehensis along with four other taxa (E. × hybrida, E. japonica, E. tomentosa, and E.  vitifolia) are known as fall-blooming anemones. In its native habitat, E. hupehensis flowers from July to October.

Cultivation 

Eriocapitella hupehensis and its cultivars are cultivated worldwide, especially in Asia, Europe, and South America, where naturalized populations are known to exist. In China, E. hupehensis has been cultivated since at least the 17th century, probably dating back to the Tang dynasty (618–907). Hundreds of years ago, a semi-double form of E. hupehensis escaped cultivation and spread across China to Japan and Korea. This descendant of E. hupehensis, now known as E. japonica, is a parent of the artificial hybrid E. × hybrida.

At the Chicago Botanic Garden, Rudy experimented with 26 cultivars of fall-blooming anemones over a 5-year period beginning in 1998. His experiments included three cultivars of E. hupehensis:

, the following cultivars have gained the Award of Garden Merit (AGM) from the Royal Horticultural Society:

 E. hupehensis 'Bowles's Pink'
 E. hupehensis 'Hadspen Abundance'

Gallery

See also 

 Eriocapitella japonica
 Eriocapitella × hybrida

References

Bibliography

External links 

 
 
 
 
 

hupehensis
Plants described in 2018
Taxa named by Maarten J. M. Christenhusz
Taxa named by James W. Byng